Streptonigrin is an aminoquinone antitumor and antibacterial antibiotic produced by Streptomyces flocculus.
Streptonigrin was a successful target of Total synthesis in 2011.

Notes
 Antitumor antibiotic streptonigrin and its derivatives as inhibitors of nitric oxide-dependent activation of soluble guanylyl cyclase

References

Antibiotics